Martin Wright may refer to:

Sportspeople
 Martin Wright (bobsledder) (born 1974), British competitor at the 2006 Winter Olympics
 Martin Wright (cricketer, born 1934), former Norfolk cricketer
 Martin Wright (cricketer, born 1963), former Hertfordshire cricketer

Others
 Martin Wright (bioengineer) (1912–2001), British bioengineer 
 Martin Wright (conductor) (born 1955), American conductor
 The owner of classical music label Move Records

See also
 Marty Wright, wrestler